Julián Ventura Valero  (born 15 May 1966 in Tampico, Mexico) is a Mexican diplomat, who served as Deputy Secretary of Foreign Affairs of Mexico from December 2018 to January 2020, G-20 Sherpa, and Chair of the Matías Romero Institute (Diplomatic Academy).

He joined the Mexican Foreign Service in 1990 and was appointed to the rank of Career Ambassador in 2006.

In the Mexican Ministry of Foreign Affairs he has served as Undersecretary for North American Affairs (2009-2012); Director-General for Asia-Pacific Affairs (2003-2007); Chief of Cabinet of the Secretary of Foreign Affairs (2002-2003); and Chief of Cabinet of the Deputy Secretary for African, Asia-Pacific, Europe, Middle Eastern and United Nations Affairs (2001-2002).

Abroad, he has served as Ambassador to the United Kingdom (2017-2018); Ambassador to the People’s Republic of China (2013-2017); Deputy Chief of Mission in the Embassy to the United States of America (2007-2009); Alternate Representative to the Organization of American States (1998-2001); Head of Political and Media Affairs in the Embassy in Cuba (1995-1998); and Alternate Representative to the International Organizations in Vienna, Austria (1990-1995).

Over the course of his diplomatic career he has represented Mexico in numerous multilateral conferences in the United Nations, the Inter-American System, APEC, the World Forum on Migration and Development and the G-20.

He holds a degree in History from the University of British Columbia (Vancouver, Canada)

Publications 

 “México en la Región Asia-Pacífico, Prioridad Ineludible”, Foreign Affairs en Español, México, volumen 7, núm. 1, enero-marzo de 2007.

 “La política exterior de México en Asia-Pacífico en el período 2000-2006”, Revista Mexicana de Política Exterior, México, Instituto Matías Romero, núms. 79-80, junio de 2007.

https://revistadigital.sre.gob.mx/images/stories/numeros/n79-80/ventura.pdf

 China y Japón: Socios Estratégicos para México”, Laura Rubio Díaz Leal (coord.), China y Japón: modernización económica, cambio político y posicionamiento mundial, México, ITAM, Senado de la República, Editorial Porrúa, 2008.

 “Presente y futuro de México en América del Norte”, en Foreign Policy (edición mexicana), México, vol. 1, núm. 1, diciembre de 2011-enero de 2012.

 “Relaciones gubernamentales entre Canadá y México”, en Alex Bugailiskis y Andrés Rozental (eds.), Canadá entre las naciones 2011-2012. Canadá y México: La Agenda Pendiente, Canadá, Carleton University, 2012.                                                                                                                                                                        http://ru.micisan.unam.mx/bitstream/handle/123456789/21477/L0092-RELACIONES_GUBERNAMENTALES-43.pdf?sequence=1&isAllowed=y
 "Relaciones económicas México-China: Una agenda de oportunidades", Julián Ventura y Rodirigo Meléndez Armada, Revista de Política Exterior, Instituto Matías Romero, Núm.108, septiembre-diciembre de 2016, México                                                                                                                                                     https://revistadigital.sre.gob.mx/images/stories/numeros/n108/venturamelendrez.pdf

Articles and Editorials 

 What Biden, Trudeau and López Obrador can do for you. Dallas Morning News,  18.11.21.

https://www.dallasnews.com/opinion/commentary/2021/11/18/what-biden-trudeau-and-lopez-obrador-can-do-for-you/

 Los 20 en el 21. Reforma, 03.11.21.

https://reforma.com/GfF8Or/los-20-en-el-21/

 Rumbo norteamericano. Reforma, 27.09.21.

https://reforma.com/2L21er
 Afganistán y las potencias: primera radiografía. Revista Nexos, 27.08.21.

https://www.nexos.com.mx/?p=60101

 Afganistán: Las vueltas del tiempo. Reforma, 17.08.21.

https://reforma.com/ivpRbr

 Biden: seis meses. Reforma, 27.07.21.

https://reforma.com/xOhCDr

 North America should use the USMCA trade agreement to leverage influence around the world. Dallas Morning News,  19.07.21.

https://www.dallasnews.com/opinion/commentary/2021/07/19/north-america-should-use-the-usmca-trade-agreement-to-leverage-influence-around-the-world/

 In Latin America, President Biden should play the long game. Dallas Morning News,  22.06.21.

https://www.dallasnews.com/opinion/commentary/2021/06/21/in-latin-america-president-biden-should-play-the-long-game/

 Las Pandemias del Porvenir. Reforma, 24.01.21.

https://reforma.com/1NW2Ar

 The road back to effective multilateralism: A view from Mexico. America’s Global Role: The View from Abroad. Chatham House. 09.02.21.

https://americas.chathamhouse.org/article/road-back-to-multilateralism-view-from-mexico/

 México en el G20: Solidaridad global para una recuperación inclusiva. El Universal, 24.11.20.

https://www.eluniversal.com.mx/opinion/julian-ventura/mexico-en-el-g20-solidaridad-global-para-una-recuperacion-inclusiva

 Cooperación en tiempos de crisis: México en el G20. Milenio, 30.03.20.

https://www.milenio.com/opinion/julian-ventura/columna-julian-ventura/cooperacion-en-tiempos-de-crisis-mexico-en-el-g20

 Mexico and Qatar: 45 years of friendship and collaboration. The Peninsula, 01.07.20.

https://www.thepeninsulaqatar.com/opinion/01/07/2020/Mexico-and-Qatar-45-years-of-friendship-and-collaboration

 La diversificación inteligente de la presencia global de México. Excelsior, 03.12.19.

https://www.excelsior.com.mx/opinion/columnista-invitado-nacional/la-diversificacion-inteligente-de-la-presencia-global-de-mexico

 Alianza transpacífica. Reforma, 20.11.19.

https://reforma.com/ILq0V2NMMMfr

 México e India: Mirando hacia el futuro. El Universal, 08.10.19.

https://www.eluniversal.com.mx/opinion/julian-ventura/mexico-e-india-mirando-hacia-el-futuro

 Mexico and Ethiopia: Building upon 70 years of friendship. The Reporter, 05.10.19.

https://www.thereporterethiopia.com/article/mexico-and-ethiopia-building-upon-70-years-friendship

 Alcance global. Reforma, 12.09.19.

https://reforma.com/zVVDppD0kyXr

 Mexico and Ghana working together for stronger relationship. GhanaWeb, 21.08.19.

https://www.ghanaweb.com/GhanaHomePage/NewsArchive/Mexico-and-Ghana-working-together-for-stronger-relationship-773874

 México en África: abriendo nuevos espacios de oportunidad. La Razón, 19.08.19

https://www.razon.com.mx/archivo/sin-categoria/mexico-en-africa-abriendo-nuevos-espacios-de-oportunidad/

 México y Reino Unido: Una firme asociación en un contexto global cambiante. El Universal, 08.08.19.

https://www.eluniversal.com.mx/julian-ventura/mexico-y-reino-unido-una-firme-asociacion-en-un-contexto-global-cambiante

 La nueva agenda de México en Beijing. El Universal, 30.06.19.

https://www.eluniversal.com.mx/articulo/julian-ventura/nacion/la-nueva-agenda-de-mexico-en-beijing

 México, G20 e inclusión social. Reforma, 27.06.19.

https://reforma.com/7JyDJThm2jmr

 México, China y una agenda económica de oportunidades. El Universal, 12.05.19.

https://www.eluniversal.com.mx/articulo/julian-ventura/nacion/mexico-china-y-una-agenda-economica-de-oportunidades

 México y Alemania, renovando su alianza para el futuro. El Universal, 03.05.19.

https://www.eluniversal.com.mx/columna/julian-ventura/nacion/mexico-y-alemania-renovando-su-alianza-para-el-futuro

 La promoción económica: al centro de la política exterior. El Financiero, 21.03.19.

https://www.elfinanciero.com.mx/opinion/colaborador-invitado/la-promocion-economica-al-centro-de-la-politica-exterior/

 MIKTA: cooperación y desarrollo. Reforma, 08.02.19.

https://reforma.com/MrkukjdoqGfr

 45 años de Relaciones Diplomáticas entre México y China. China Hoy, 24.03.17.

https://almomento.mx/45-anos-relaciones-diplomaticas-mexico-china/

 México y la economía mundial del siglo XXI. Excelsior, 16.05.16

https://www.excelsior.com.mx/opinion/mexico-global/2016/05/16/1092843

 México: Plataforma de acercamiento entre China y América Latina y el Caribe, El Financiero, 14.10.15.

https://www.elfinanciero.com.mx/opinion/julian-ventura/mexico-plataforma-de-acercamiento-entre-china-y-america-latina-y-el-caribe/

 China, destino estratégico para productos del campo mexicano. Milenio, 20.09.15.

https://www.milenio.com/opinion/julian-ventura/columna-julian-ventura/china-destino-estrategico-productos-campo-mexicano

 México y China de cara al futuro. Excelsior, 10.11.14.                                                                                                                                                                                                                                                                       https://www.google.com/url?client=internal-element-cse&cx=012394942619524936727:aqmfejabqhs&q=https://www.excelsior.com.mx/opinion/mexico-global/2014/11/10/991531&sa=U&ved=2ahUKEwiC797o4eDwAhVTVc0KHRPIDDc4KBAWMAR6BAgNEAI&usg=AOvVaw115m4ZEHgfj7QzIe-y91AnReferences

1966 births
Living people
Ambassadors of Mexico to China
Ambassadors of Mexico to the United Kingdom